The Minister of Liberated Regions was a cabinet position in France after World War I (1914–18) responsible for the reintegration of the regions of Alsace and Lorraine that had been incorporated in Germany after the Franco-Prussian War of 1870.

History

On 17 November 1917, Georges Clemenceau created the Ministry of Blockade, which was also responsible for the liberated regions.
The first minister was Charler-Célestin Jonnart, replaced on 23 November 1917 by Albert François Lebrun. 
Lebrun took responsibility for the liberated regions, while M. Delavaud took responsibility for the blockade.
Émile Ogier, a career civil servant, was minister from January 1920 until Louis Loucheur took over.
Louis Marin (politician) was Minister from 29 March 1924 to 14 June 1924 in the third cabinet of Raymond Poincaré and the ephemeral cabinet of Frédéric François-Marsal.

Ministers

Notes

Sources